The 2017-18 North Dakota Fighting Hawks men's ice hockey season was the 76th season of play for the program and the 5th in the NCHC conference. The Fighting Hawks represented the University of North Dakota and were coached by Brad Berry, in his 3rd season.

Roster
As of September 8, 2017.

Standings

Schedule and Results

|-
!colspan=12 style=";" | Exhibition

|-
!colspan=12 style=";" | Regular Season

Rankings

References

North Dakota Fighting Hawks men's ice hockey seasons
North Dakota Fighting Hawks
North Dakota Fighting Hawks
North Dakota Fighting Hawks
North Dakota Fighting Hawks